Magodendron is a genus of flowering plants belonging to the family Sapotaceae.

Its native range is New Guinea.

Species:

Magodendron mennyae 
Magodendron venefici

References

Chrysophylloideae
Sapotaceae genera